Ariane Schneider (born 12 March 1985) is a Swiss synchronized swimmer who competed in the 2008 Summer Olympics.

References

1985 births
Living people
Swiss synchronized swimmers
Olympic synchronized swimmers of Switzerland
Synchronized swimmers at the 2008 Summer Olympics
Synchronized swimmers at the 2005 World Aquatics Championships